Cyperus polyanthelus is a species of sedge that is native to parts of India.

See also 
 List of Cyperus species

References 

polyanthelus
Plants described in 1979
Flora of India